The ABCs of Death is a 2012 American comedy horror anthology film produced by international producers and directed by filmmakers from around the world. The film contains 26 shorts, each by different directors spanning fifteen countries, including Nacho Vigalondo, Kaare Andrews, Adam Wingard, Simon Barrett, Banjong Pisanthanakun, Ben Wheatley, Lee Hardcastle, Noboru Iguchi, Ti West, and Angela Bettis.

It premiered at the Toronto International Film Festival in 2012. In 2013, it was released on VOD January 31 and in theaters March 8. The end credits of the film feature Australian band Skyhooks' 1974 song "Horror Movie". The movie's financial success, launched the titular film series thereafter; including a sequel film in 2014, and a spin-off movie in 2016.

Background
The film is divided into 26 individual chapters, each helmed by a different director assigned a letter of the alphabet. The directors were then given free rein in choosing a word to create a story involving death. The varieties of death range from accidents to murders.

A contest was held for the role of the 26th director. The winner was UK-based director Lee Hardcastle, who submitted the claymation short for T.

Plot
The film begins showing a close up of a funnel with blood pouring ominously from it. The blood proceeds to fill up various rooms inside of a house before filling up the interior of a small room containing letter blocks. The room floods as the blocks float to the top spelling out the title. Throughout the film, the blocks spell out the titles to all the segments with each of the segments ending and beginning with a focus on, or a fade into, the color red.

Reception
Rotten Tomatoes reports that 37% of critics gave the film a positive review and an average score of 4.8/10 based on 68 reviews. The consensus says the film "is wildly uneven, with several legitimately scary entries and a bunch more that miss the mark". Nerdist calls it "a midnight movie for folks with a sick sense of humour". The Austin Chronicle says it "soars to such artistic heights, and such tasteless depths, on a global scale, no less, bodes well for the future of cinema fantastique and otherwise", while Inside Pulse says the movie has a "brilliant concept but not great execution". Many reviewers criticized the film shorts' unevenness.

Dread Central gave a mixed review for the film, saying the film is "full of installments that are more bad than good" but that it was an "easy watch" overall. Film School Rejects gave The ABCs of Death a B rating, praising D is for Dogfight while saying that "M is for Miscarriage is almost insulting in its laziness". Screen Crush gave an overall positive review, saying that it was "a good time at the movies".

Dave Canfield writing for film magazine Magill's Cinema Annual said of the film: "The ABCs of Death is for anyone who loves horror since it is easy to skip through segments that are not to taste. Any viewer should be prepared to laugh pretty hard; feel tense; get grossed out like they would at any halfway decent horror film. But that same viewer now has a chance to find out about some of the best directors working in horror today".

Sheila Kearns case 
After showing the film to a group of high school Spanish students, former Ohio substitute teacher Sheila Kearns was found guilty of four counts of disseminating matter harmful to juveniles. Kearns was convicted, and on 5 March 2015, she was sentenced to 90 days in jail and probation for three years.

Notes

References

External links
 
 
 
 
 

2012 films
2012 black comedy films
2012 comedy horror films
American comedy horror films
American black comedy films
American independent films
Bigfoot films
Films based on urban legends
American horror anthology films
American supernatural horror films
American splatter films
Films directed by Jason Eisener
Films directed by Noboru Iguchi
Films directed by Jake West
Films directed by Ti West
Films directed by Xavier Gens
Films directed by Yoshihiro Nishimura
Films scored by Simon Boswell
American vampire films
American monster movies
American serial killer films
Films about child sexual abuse
Films with screenplays by Keith Calder
Films with screenplays by Simon Barrett (filmmaker)
Films directed by Anders Morgenthaler
American exploitation films
2010s English-language films
2010s American films